Graciela Rincón Calcaño ( Maracaibo 1904 – Caracas 1987) was a Venezuelan writer and poet.

1904 births
1987 deaths
Venezuelan women writers
20th-century Venezuelan poets
20th-century women writers